Benjamin "Ben" de Jager (born 12 January 1980) is a South African born former Italian rugby union player.

References

External links 
 

1980 births
Living people
South African rugby union players
Italian rugby union players
South African emigrants to Italy
South African expatriates in Italy
Italian sportspeople of African descent
Rugby union players from Cape Town
Italy international rugby union players
Rugby union wings